HMCS Calgary was a Royal Canadian Navy revised  which took part in convoy escort duties during the Second World War. She fought primarily in the Battle of the Atlantic. She was named for Calgary, Alberta.

Background

Flower-class corvettes like Calgary serving with the Royal Canadian Navy during the Second World War were different from earlier and more traditional sail-driven corvettes.  The "corvette" designation was created by the French as a class of small warships; the Royal Navy borrowed the term for a period but discontinued its use in 1877. During the hurried preparations for war in the late 1930s, Winston Churchill reactivated the corvette class, needing a name for smaller ships used in an escort capacity, in this case based on a whaling ship design. The generic name "flower" was used to designate the class of these ships, which – in the Royal Navy – were named after flowering plants.

Corvettes commissioned by the Royal Canadian Navy during the Second World War were named after communities for the most part, to better represent the people who took part in building them. This idea was put forth by Admiral Percy W. Nelles. Sponsors were commonly associated with the community for which the ship was named. Royal Navy corvettes were designed as open sea escorts, while Canadian corvettes were developed for coastal auxiliary roles which was exemplified by their minesweeping gear. Eventually the Canadian corvettes would be modified to allow them to perform better on the open seas.

Construction
Calgary was ordered 20 February 1941 as part of the Revised 1940-41 Flower class building program. This revised program radically changed the look of the Flower-class corvette. The ships of this program kept the water-tube boilers of the initial 1940-41 program, but now they were housed in separate compartments for safety. The fo'c'sle was extended, which allowed more space for berths for the crew, leading to an expansion of the crew. The bow had increased flare for better control in heavy seas. The revised Flowers of the RCN received an additional two depth charge throwers fitted amidships and more depth charges. They also came with heavier secondary armament with 20-mm anti-aircraft guns carried on the extended bridge wings. All this led to an increase in displacement, draught and length.

Calgary was laid down by Marine Industries Ltd. at Sorel on 22 March 1941 and launched on 23 August of that year. She was commissioned into the RCN on 16 December 1941 at Sorel. During her career she had two significant refits. The first began in December 1942 after Calgary developed severe mechanical problems. She was forced to undergo a three-month refit at Cardiff which was only completed in March 1943. The second major overhaul took place between January and March 1944 at Liverpool, Nova Scotia.

Wartime service

After arriving at Halifax 28 December 1941, she was initially assigned to the Western Local Escort Force (WLEF). She remained with that force until November 1942.

In November 1942 Calgary was deployed to assist in Operation Torch, the amphibious invasion of French North Africa as part of the North African Campaign. However, after arrival in the United Kingdom she developed severe mechanical problems which led to an extensive refit. She only returned to service in April 1943, having never taken part in any duties connected to Operation Torch.

Upon resumption of her duties she sailed back to Canada and rejoined WLEF in April 1943. In June 1943 she transferred to escort group 5, also known as the 5th Support Group, under Western Approaches Command. On 23 August 1943 Calgary, as part of the 5th Support Group, was deployed to relieve the 40th Escort Group which was undertaking a U-boat hunt off Cape Ortegal. The warships of both groups were attacked by 14 Dornier Do 217s and 7 Junkers Ju 87s that were carrying a new weapon, the Henschel Hs 293 anti-ship guided missile.

In December 1943, she transferred to the 6th Support Group, before departing for refit in January 1944.

In May 1944, Calgary, after completing workups was ordered to the United Kingdom and in June 1944  was deployed to assist in Operation Neptune, the amphibious invasion of Normandy, France known as D-Day (Operation Overlord). In September 1944, she was reassigned to Nore Command and remained with them for the remained of the war.

Post-war service
After the cessation of hostilities Calgary returned to Canada in May 1945 and was paid off from the RCN on 19 June 1945 at Sorel. She was sold for scrapping on 30 August 1946 and broken up in 1951 at Hamilton.

Notes

External links

 
 

Flower-class corvettes of the Royal Canadian Navy
1941 ships